Carlos De La Rosa better known by his stage name Karlos Rosé is a Dominican Bachata music artist. He began his career as a singer on the Dominican television program Divertido con Jochy when he was seventeen years old. In 2012, he released his debut single "Just the Way You Are", a bachata music cover of Bruno Mars's song which reached number one on the Billboard Tropical Songs. In 2013, his second single "Infiel", which was originally performed by Colombian music group Daniel Calderon y Los Gigantes, also reached number one on the Tropical Songs chart. In the same year, he collaborated with American pianist Arthur Hanlon to perform a cover of The Jackson 5's song "I'll Be There. It reached number four on the Tropical Songs chart.

Discography
 Géminis (2015)
Ojos Verdes - 3:41
Mentías - 4:04
Mi Lugar Es Contigo (Bachata Version) - 3:36
El Único Que Te Ha Amado - 3:58
Por Ti - 4:20
Que No Salga El Sol - 3:47
Princesita - 3:36
Enseñame A Olvidar - 3:52
Niña De Mi Corazón - 3:05
Por Amarte - 3:53
Infiel - 4:25
Just The Way You Are - 3:40
Ojos Verdes (Accordion Version) - 3:41
Mi Lugar Es Contigo (Pop Version) - 3:33

 Sabotaje (2019)
Sabotaje - 3:29
Te Salvaré  - 3:17
Siento Que Muero - 3:50
La Ronda - 3:32
El Juego - 3:34
Mi Cama Es Testigo - 3:25
Brindo - 3:29
Ya Te Olvide - 3:37
No Dejo De Amarte - 4:10

Singles

Featured

References

Living people
21st-century Dominican Republic male singers
Bachata musicians
Universal Music Latin Entertainment artists
Machete Music artists
1995 births